Oracle "Orko"  is a fictional character from the Masters of the Universe franchise. A sorcerer and the last of his species (in Netflix's 2021 continuation), Orko first appeared in the 1980s Filmation series He-Man and the Masters of the Universe, also making feature appearances in episodes of the shows' direct spinoff series She-Ra: Princess of Power and then in the 2002 remake of the original series. In 2021, Orko returned for Masters of the Universe: Revelation which serves as a continuation of the original 1980s series. The character was named Gorpo in the early original series drafts, but he was renamed Orko (his original name was used in the Brazilian Portuguese-language dub of the original series). Orko was not part of the original toy collection on which the 1980s show is based, but when he was created by the show's writers as comic relief, a toy figure of him was then manufactured.

Appearances

He-Man and the Masters of the Universe (1983)
Orko is first introduced in the 1983 animated series. Orko is a Trollan, a race of beings from Trolla, a world in another dimension. Trollans wear red robes, red hats, and hide their faces beneath hats and behind scarves. In Trollan society, showing one's face to each other is considered an intimate act, similar to humans sharing a kiss. A production drawing of Orko without his hat showed him resembling a little blue elf, but it was never used in the series. Orko does reveal his face in the episode "Dawn of Dragoon", but his face is not visible to the audience, though his shadow indicates he is bald. Trollans appear to be blue-skinned humanoids with pointy ears. However, their feet remain hidden under their robes. Trollans have natural magical abilities, including levitation, which they use exclusively instead of walking. In one episode, Orko temporarily loses the power of levitation, and can be seen crawling around on his knees. Still, some Trollans have greater magical power than others; Orko's uncle, for example, is a noted magician. Orko knows He-Man's true identity.

Orko has always had trouble with his magical powers. A recurring joke in the series is that almost every time he tries to use magic, it backfires in an amusing way; the reason for this is not clear. In one episode, it is suggested that Trolla operates with natural laws that are the opposite of Eternia's, and in Trolla, Orko was a good magician. However, in later episodes this is contradicted, and Orko is shown to be equally incompetent even on Trolla. Another episode indicates that Orko possessed a magical pendant that allows him to use magic correctly, but he later lost it. The amulet later turned up stuck on the back of a dinosaur resurrected by Skeletor. When Orko got back the amulet to erase the happening events, it goes back on the dinosaur before it all happens.

In addition to his magic incantations, Orko also stores an impossibly large plethora of items inside his hat, some useful, some not so useful.

Orko came to Eternia when a cosmic storm accidentally transported him there. He appeared in the Tar Swamp, where he found a young Prince Adam and his pet, Cringer, at the time a tiger cub, and saved them both from dying in the tar. However, he lost his pendant in the process after colliding with a tree.

Stuck on Eternia, Orko was made Royal Buffoon by the King of Eternia in gratitude for having saved his son. Orko became one of Adam's closest friends; in fact, Orko knows that Adam is secretly He-Man, it is revealed in season one episode one of the Masters of the Universe that Orko followed Prince Adam to Castle Greyskull, thus knowing He-Man and Prince Adam's true identity. Orko frequently annoys Man-At-Arms, due to his magic constantly backfiring or Orko coming into his lab unexpected and uninvited and messing with his equipment, which gets on Man-At-Arms' nerves, rather than amusing him as it does others. Orko has proven to be a good friend and a valuable ally, despite his unpredictable powers and the fact he is more than a little clueless. Sometimes, Orko wonders how useful he is to He-Man, but despite his apparent cowardliness, he never fails to help those in need. Also, throughout the series, Adam/He-Man is constantly in Orko's debt for saving his life when he was a child. On two occasions, He-Man has helped Orko regain his magical powers.

Orko returns to Trolla, with the help of others, on a number of occasions. The first time, he helps He-Man save the lives of several Trollans captured by one of Skeletor's allies, a humanoid dragon named Dragoon, and begins a romance with a Trollan girl named Dree Elle. However, he decides that his place is now on Eternia, and returns there. However, he still occasionally visits his friends and relatives on Trolla.

She-Ra: Princess of Power (1985)
Orko played a key role in several episodes of this spin off series about He-Man's twin sister She-Ra, as well as featuring as a main character in the He-Man and She-Ra Christmas special made for television movie.

He-Man and the Masters of the Universe (2002)
He-Man and the Masters of the Universe would get a remake series in 2002 where Orko is essentially the same with a slightly more elaborate costume. It is revealed that he and Cringer followed Prince Adam to Castle Grayskull and watched him transform into He-Man for the first time. Orko then follows He-Man and the new Battle Cat into battle and almost reveals He-Man's identity to Teela and the other Masters, despite having been warned not to by both The Sorceress and He-Man. Fortunately, Man-At-Arms, who recognizes He-Man as the alter ego of Adam, quickly steps in and stops him, informing Teela and the other Masters that the new hero is He-Man and that the Sorceress had told him of He-Man's coming beforehand. In this series, Orko was a very powerful wizard, but when he came to Eternia and saved Prince Adam, he lost his wand, which he needed to control his magic. Orko is the jester of the royal palace since his arrival, and although he is well liked, only a few take him seriously. Orko is always keen to become the great sorcerer he once was, however, without his wand to control his magic, he is prone to causing havoc around the palace. Despite not having his wand, there have been instances where Orko has played a huge role in battles. In the episode "Lesson", he managed to successfully disarm Skeletor of the Ram Stone. In the episode "Last Stand", Orko managed to evade being captured by Skeletor's council of evil and returned Prince Adam's power sword to him. A flashback episode, "The Power of Grayskull", reveals the history of Adam's ancestor King Grayskull, who goes on a quest for the power to defend Eternia, and encounters an Oracle who looked and sounded much like Orko, suggesting that other Trollans might have found their way to Eternia.

Masters of the Universe: Revelation (2021)
In July 2021, the Netflix series "Masters of the Universe: Revelation" was released. The series is a pseudo continuation of the original He-Man and the Masters of the Universe series and takes place many years after the events of the original series. Orko is voiced by actor Griffin Newman. Orko first appears to be the same comic relief as he was in the 1980s series. Following the death of Prince Adam who as He-Man sacrifices himself for his friends, Adam's father King Randor banishes Duncan/Man-At-Arms for failing him and allowing his son to die. Duncan's daughter Teela, now aware that Adam is He-Man, resigns from her position as Captain of the Palace Royal Guard which she was recently appointed to and feels betrayed that her father kept Adam's secret hidden from her all these years. Orko pleads with her to not leave, but she does regardless. We next see Orko some time later living with Duncan. Orko is in a very weak state having lost most of his powers and magical abilities due to the events surrounding He-Man's death. Teela along with Evil-Lynn, Beast Man, and Andra pays a visit to her now estranged father asking for his help and his expertise to locate and combine the two halves of the Sword of Power. Roboto is sent in his place and Orko also joins the group on their journey to locate the Sword of Power. In the fourth episode of the series titled "Land of the Dead" upon entering Subternia, Evil-Lyn and Orko are separated from the remainder of their group within an illusion while Teela is isolated by Scare Glow who has taken over the Land of the Dead. Orko reveals to Evil-Lyn that his original name was in fact Oracle. When he was younger, he pronounced it "Orko". Orko discovers that the Font of Mystical Energy, the lifeforce of Orko's species, has been dried up, making Orko the last Trollan species left. Deceased spirits of the Trollans arrive and merge to form a monster to combat Evil-Lyn and Orko while Teela faces off against nightmare versions of He-Man and herself. Teela conquers her fear of her own power, destroys all the illusions, and the group is reunited. Evil-Lyn uses the half of the Sword of Power to open a gate to Preternia, but is chased after by Scare Glow. Orko remains behind and sacrifices himself to hold Scare Glow off while the rest of the group escape. In the following episode "The Forge at the Forrest Forever", the group of heroes mourn the death of their friend Orko and a gravestone is seen with his name on it.

He-Man and the Masters of the Universe (2021)

Comics
In the Marvel/Star Comics, Orko is more or less similar to his animated counterpart.

In the DC series, DC Universe vs. The Masters of the Universe, during the time that Skeletor had taken over Eternia, Orko discovered that Skeletor had the Skull of Power, and tried to destroy it, but sadly Orko's spell backfired. Orko got blasted by the full force of evil inside the skull. Orko absorbed the worst of the skull and it unlocked his mental barriers, granting him power undreamed of. This came at the cost of his humanity, and made him a "Mad God."

Then, when Skeletor was defeated by He-Man, Dark Orko used his power to transport Skeletor to Trolla, Orko's home dimension. There, Dark Orko had transformed the Trollans into monsters and he used his power to transform Skeletor into something more powerful, and sent him to Earth. There, Dark Orko commanded Skeletor to siphon Earth's magic and funnel it to him on Trolla. Skeletor obeyed, and when He-Man, Teela and Evil-Lyn show up, Dark Orko kidnaps Superman, traps him on Trolla, and replaces him with a copy, which He-Man accidentally kills, thus turning the heroes of Earth against the Masters of the Universe.

While the Masters fight the heroes of Earth, Dark Orko tortures Superman on Trolla. When He-Man arrives on Trolla, Dark Orko turns to Skeletor for help, but Skeletor turns on Dark Orko, pulling the wizard off Trolla on to Earth. There, Dark Orko battles the heroes of Earth and the Masters of the Universe. Then, when Superman and He-Man destroy the Skull of Power, Skeletor attacks Dark Orko, banishing him to places unknown. Afterwards, He-Man vows not to rest until Orko's soul has been purged of evil.

Live-action
Orko was originally supposed to appear in the 1987 live-action "Masters of the Universe" theatrical film his design was too complex for the studio to produce in live action with its limited budget. Instead the character of Gwildor, played by Billy Barty was created for the film to replace Orko and provide the comic relief.

In 2018 it was reported that Orko will appear in the upcoming live-action movie. In the film, Orko will be reimagined as a small man whose self-doubt holds him back from being a reasonably mediocre wizard. Since 2018, the film has seen many delays and changes with cast and scripts along with the release date pushed back many times. As of July 2021, production on the film has yet to begin and currently appears to be on hold.

Other Trollans
Other members of Orko's race who have appeared in the Masters of the Universe shows include:
Dree Elle - Orko's girlfriend, who appears in the episodes "Dawn of Dragoon", "Dree Elle's Return", "Trouble in Trolla" and "The Bitter Rose" as well as the She-Ra: Princess of Power episode "The Greatest Magic";
Yuckers - Dree Elle's prank-playing younger brother from "Dree Elle's Return";
Uncle Montork - Orko's uncle, from the episodes "Orko's Favorite Uncle", "The Return of Orko's Uncle" and "Trouble in Trolla" as well as the She-Ra episode "The Greatest Magic";
Snoob - misguided Trollan wizard who appears in the episode "Trouble in Trolla";
Prankster/Wakrapanike - a member of a race of Trollans who excels in practical jokes, who appears in the episode "Trouble's Middle Name"; the only Trollan not to conceal his face;
Squonge - Orko's friend from the episode "Orko's New Friend", identical to Orko aside from wearing a pilot helmet, known for concocting tall tales;
Doctor Zoog - an evil Trollan scientist who believes that Trolla should be run by machines, not magic. He appears in the She-Ra: Princess of Power episode "The Greatest Magic";
The Oracle - all-knowing oracle from the episode "The Power of Grayskull" of the 2002 series; resided on Ancient Eternia in a flashback sequence. The Oracle is the only other Trollan besides Orko to appear in the modern series;

Reception
The character is a well known and loved character by fans of the original show.

In Brazil, the character is universally recognized and loved by adults and children, even today. Even people who haven't seen the show will still recognize Orko, (or Gorpo, as he is known in Brazilian dubbing) from other media, like illustrations and mainly memes on the internet.

The showrunner Kevin Smith initially said that when he sat down with the writers, he saw no other way to redeem the character, who he considered "the weakest link" and "no one liked" except through death.
This decision generated mostly negative criticism from fans. While critics praised the decision saying it brought depth to the character in an arc of redemption; fans viewed the decision as an affront and a provocation on the part of Smith, who later openly admitted that the choice to kill the character was made solely to anger fans.

Cultural references
 In an episode of the television series Robot Chicken, after seeing He-Man dead after Beast Man killed him with his axe, Orko used his sword to become powerful and defeat Skeletor and his minions singlehandedly. When the Sorceress wanted to take He-Man back to Castle Grayskull to bring him back to life, Orko kills her with his sword so that he may remain powerful rather than regressing to being the court jester again. In the episode "I'm Trapped", Orko appeared as a partygoer at King Randor's birthday party when Faker (who was mistaken for the real He-Man) showed up. Claiming Faker was cold, Orko offered him some hot coffee only for Faker to spill it into Orko's hood. In the episode "Major League of Extraordinary Gentlemen", Orko fumes at being stuck in an elevator with Snarf from ThunderCats and ridicules his habit of repeating his name after every sentence;
 In "Imaginationland", an episode of the television series South Park, Orko appears as an inhabitant of a dimension with the same name. In the episode, all fictional characters created by the human mind live in Imaginationland;
 The character Gwildor (played by Billy Barty) was created especially for the live-action movie as a substitute for Orko, whose design was too complex for the studio to produce in live action with its limited budget. Frederick S. Clarke explains that Gwildor was "reportedly a stand-in for Orko...In the series, Orko has no feet or legs and is always seen floating or flying, a difficult concept to film live."

References

Fictional anthropomorphic characters
Fictional characters who use magic
Fictional characters from parallel universes
Male characters in animated series
Masters of the Universe Heroic Warriors
Television characters introduced in 1983